The Edmund A. Walsh School of Foreign Service (SFS) is the school of international relations at Georgetown University in Washington, D.C. It is consistently ranked among the world's leading international affairs schools, granting degrees at both undergraduate and graduate levels. Notable alumni include former U.S. president Bill Clinton, former CIA director George Tenet, and King Felipe VI of Spain, as well as numerous other heads of state or government. Its faculty has also included many distinguished figures in international affairs, such as former U.S. secretary of state Madeleine Albright, former U.S. secretary of defense Chuck Hagel, and former president of Poland Aleksander Kwaśniewski.

Founded in 1919, SFS is the oldest continuously operating school for international affairs in the United States, predating the U.S. Foreign Service by six years, and many of its graduates pursue careers in U.S. foreign policy. Despite its reputation for producing prominent American statesmen and diplomats, the school is not a diplomatic academy, and its graduates go on to have careers in a diverse range of sectors, including Wall Street.

The School of Foreign Service was established by Fr. Edmund A. Walsh, S.J. with the goal of preparing Americans for various international professions in the wake of expanding U.S. involvement in world affairs after the First World War. Today, the school hosts a student body of approximately 2,250 from over 100 nations each year. It offers an undergraduate program based in the liberal arts, which leads to the Bachelor of Science in Foreign Service (BSFS) degree, as well as eight interdisciplinary graduate programs.

History

With the help of Georgetown University president Fr. John B. Creeden, S.J., Fr. Walsh spearheaded the founding of the School of Foreign Service and its establishment was announced on November 25, 1919. The school's use of the name “Foreign Service” preceded the formal establishment of the U.S. Foreign Service by six years. The school was envisioned by Fr. Walsh to prepare students for all major forms of foreign representation from commercial, financial, consular to diplomatic.

In 1921, it graduated its first class of Bachelor of Science in Foreign Service (BSFS) undergraduate students. The following year, the school began to offer the first international relations graduate program in the United States, the Master of Science in Foreign Service (MSFS). In August 1932, the SFS was moved to the Healy Hall, a National Historic Landmark.

In 1958, two years after the death of Fr. Walsh, the school was renamed after him and moved to the Walsh Building in a ceremony dedicated by President Eisenhower in honor of Fr. Walsh. Since 1982, the school has been housed in the Edward B. Bunn, S.J. Intercultural Center (ICC) on the main campus.

Academics

Undergraduate programs
The SFS offers the Bachelor of Science in Foreign Service (BSFS) degree rooted in the liberal arts. Following completion of the core requirements, students declare one of the following interdisciplinary majors:
 Culture and Politics (CULP)
 Global Business (GBUS)
 International Economics (IECO)
 International History (IHIS)
 International Political Economy (IPEC)
 International Politics (IPOL)
 Regional and Comparative Studies (RCST)
 Science, Technology, & International Affairs (STIA) 

There is also a joint degree in Business and Global Affairs (BGA) offered in partnership with Georgetown University's McDonough School of Business.

Graduate programs
Graduate students can pursue eight interdisciplinary graduate degrees in the school:
 Master of Science in Foreign Service (MSFS) with concentrations in:
 Global Business, Finance & Society (GBFS)
 Global Politics & Security (GPS)
 International Development (IDEV)
 Science, Technology, and International Affairs (STIA)
 Master of Arts in Security Studies (SSP)
 Master of Global Human Development (GHD)
 Master of Arts in Arab Studies (MAAS)
 Master of Arts in Asian Studies (MASIA)
 Master of Arts in German and European Studies (MAGES)
 Master of Arts in Eurasian, Russian and East European Studies (MAERES)
 Master of Arts in Latin American Studies (CLAS)
There are also two joint degrees offered in partnership with Georgetown's McDonough School of Business. The first is the Global Executive MBA, which is offered in collaboration with the ESADE Business School in Spain. and the INCAE Business School in Costa Rica. The second is the MA in International Business and Policy (MA-IBP).
SFS is a member of the Association of Professional Schools of International Affairs (APSIA), a group of public policy, public administration, and international affairs schools.

Certificates
Georgetown offers a number of undergraduate certificate programs: African studies, Arab studies, Asian studies, Australian & New Zealand studies, German and European studies, international business diplomacy, international development, Muslim-Christian understanding, Jewish civilization, justice & peace studies, Latin American studies, medieval studies, Russian & East European studies, social & political thought, and women's and gender studies.

Reputation and rankings
Georgetown's programs in international relations have consistently ranked among the best in the world in surveys of the field's academics that have been published biennially since 2005 by Foreign Policy magazine. In 2014 and in 2018 Foreign Policy ranked Georgetown's master's programs first in the world and its bachelor's programs fourth. In a separate survey of makers of American foreign-policy from 2011, Georgetown ranked second overall in the quality of preparation for a career in the U.S. government, regardless of degree earned.

Campuses

The School of Foreign Service main campus, which is part of the main campus of Georgetown University, is located in the Georgetown neighborhood in Northwest Washington, D.C. In 2005, it opened another campus, the School of Foreign Service in Qatar (also known as SFS-Q or GU-Q), in Qatar Foundation's Education City in Doha, Qatar. Many SFS undergraduates spend a minimum of one semester or a summer abroad, choosing from direct matriculation programs around the globe as well as programs of other universities and those run by Georgetown, including SFS-Q and Villa Le Balze.

List of deans

Notable alumni

 Abdullah II of Jordan (1987), King of Jordan
 Adel al-Jubeir (1984) Minister of State for Foreign Affairs of Saudi Arabia
 John R. Allen, former Commander of International Coalition in Afghanistan, President of Brookings Institution
 Steve Bannon (1983), White House Chief Strategist and Counselor to the President under President Trump
 José Durão Barroso (1987), President of the European Commission and former Prime Minister of Portugal
 Philip Bilden (1986), U.S. Secretary of the Navy nominee in the Trump administration
 Bill Bryant, Seattle Port Commissioner from 2008 to 2015
 George Casey (1970), U.S. Army Chief of Staff
 Laura Chinchilla Miranda (1959), 46th President of Costa Rica
 Joseph Cirincione (1983), former President of The Ploughshares Fund
 Paul Clement (1988), U.S. Solicitor General and Acting U.S. Attorney General
 Bill Clinton (1968), 42nd President of the United States
 Anne Dias-Griffin (1993), hedge fund manager
 Stéphane Dujarric (1988), Spokesman for UN Secretaries-General Kofi Annan, Ban Ki-moon and António Guterres
 Richard Durbin (1966), U.S. Senator from Illinois, Majority Whip of the United States Senate
 Felipe VI (1991), King of Spain
 Luis Fortuño (1982), Governor of Puerto Rico
 Dexter Goei (1993), CEO of Altice
 Christopher Grady, Vice Chairman of U.S. Joint Chiefs of Staff
 Dalia Grybauskaitė, President of Lithuania
 Alexander Haig (1961), U.S. Secretary of State under Ronald Reagan, Supreme Allied Commander Europe of NATO (1974–79)
 Daniel Henninger, columnist, The Wall Street Journal
 Mushahid Hussain, Opposition Leader in Pakistan, candidate for President of Pakistan in 2008
 James Matthew Jones (1983), global health expert and philanthropist
 James L. Jones (1966), U.S. National Security Advisor under President Obama
 Eugen Jurzyca, Minister of Education of Slovakia
 John F. Kelly (1984), Retired Marine General, the 5th U.S. Secretary of Homeland Security and White House Chief of Staff in the Trump Administration
 Kathleen Kingsbury (2001) Opinion Editor, New York Times
 Željko Komšić, President of Bosnia and Herzegovina from 2006 to 2014
 Taro Kono (1986), Foreign Minister of Japan
 Gloria Macapagal Arroyo (1968), president of the Philippines from 2001 to 2010
 David Malpass (1982), President of the World Bank
 Denis McDonough (1996), President Obama's Chief of Staff and former Deputy National Security Advisor, Secretary of Veteran's Affairs in Biden administration 
 Kayleigh McEnany (2010), CNN Commentator; press secretary to President Trump
 Maeve Kennedy McKean (2009), attorney and U.S. Health official
 Mick Mulvaney (1989), Director of U.S. Office of Management and Budget and White House Chief of Staff under President Trump
 Kirstjen Nielsen (1994), U.S. Secretary of Homeland Security under President Trump
 Darcy Olsen, CEO of the Goldwater Institute
 Jon Ossoff, (2009), U.S. Senator from Georgia
 Sandra Oudkirk, first female Director of the American Institute in Taiwan (AIT)
 Armand Peschard-Sverdrup, Mexican political scientist 
 Pat Quinn (1969), Governor of Illinois
 Carl Reiner (1943), actor, film producer, film director, Emmy Award winner
 Tony Ressler (1981), billionaire and owner of the Atlanta Hawks
 Matthew A. Reynolds (1986), former Assistant Secretary of State for Legislative Affairs (2008–2009)
 Chris Sacca (1997), Founder of Lowercase Capital
 Therese Shaheen (1980), Chairman of the American Institute of Taiwan, 2002–2004; businesswoman
Arjun Singh Sethi (2003), civil rights writer and lawyer
 Debora Spar (1984), Former President, Barnard College at Columbia University, member Board of Directors of Goldman Sachs, first female President of Lincoln Center
 Courtney Stadd (1981), NASA Chief of Staff from 2001 to 2003
 Daniel Sullivan (1993), U.S. Senator from Alaska
 George Tenet (1976), Director of the CIA from 1997 to 2004
 Matthew VanDyke, freedom fighter and Prisoner of War (POW) in the 2011 Libyan Civil War
 Marcus Wallenberg, a banker and industrialist
 Margaret Weichert (1989), deputy director for Management in the Office of Management and Budget, Director of the U.S. Office of Personnel Management
 Nawaf Obaid (1996), political scientist and former Saudi foreign policy advisor
 Igor Danchenko (2009), geopolitical analyst known for sourcing the Steele dossier

References

Citations

Sources

External links
 Official website